

2009

See also

References

List of killings by law enforcement officers in the United States, 2009
2009 in the United States
United States
2009